Qiang Ji from the Rensselaer Polytechnic Institute, Troy, New York, United States, was named Fellow of the Institute of Electrical and Electronics Engineers (IEEE) in 2015 for contributions to automatic facial image processing and affective computing.

References

Fellow Members of the IEEE
Rensselaer Polytechnic Institute faculty
Year of birth missing (living people)
Living people
Place of birth missing (living people)
American electrical engineers